Anton Pein (born May 9, 1967) is an Austrian former darts player, regarded as one of the country's best players. He is a former Electronic-Darts World Champion and participated in the 2007 PDC World Darts Championship where he began as a 5000/1 outsider. He met and was defeated by Phil Taylor in the first round.

Pein qualified to represent the GDC at the 2008 Las Vegas Desert Classic. He failed to qualify for the event, having lost in the two qualifying events to Barrie Bates and Andy Beardsmore.

Following the closure of the GDC in 2009, Pein returned to the BDO circuit where he played before qualifying for the PDC World Championship.  He attempted to qualify for the 2010 BDO World Darts Championship but lost out in the earlier rounds. He did however win the Austrian Open title for a second time having first won the title in 2005.

External links
Profile and Stats on Darts Database

1967 births
Austrian darts players
Living people
Professional Darts Corporation associate players
British Darts Organisation players
Sportspeople from Klagenfurt